Russian Foundation for Advanced Research Projects is an advanced military research agency. The foundation is tasked with informing the country's leadership on projects that can ensure Russian superiority in defense technology. It will also analyze the risks of any Russian technological backwardness and technological dependence on other powers.

History

In June 2012, President Vladimir Putin has submitted to parliament a bill on the foundation's establishment. In July 2012, the lower house of the Russian parliament, the State Duma, passed the law in first reading. Deputy Prime Minister Dmitry Rogozin said when he presented the draft law that "The sole purpose of this foundation is to close a gap in advanced research with our Western partners after 20 years of stagnation in the Russian military science and defense industry overall".

See also
 Armed Forces of the Russian Federation
 Defense industry of Russia
 Military-Industrial Commission of Russia

References

External links

 
Technical Report: The Advanced Research Foundation in Defense Innovation System / Public Council of the Military-Industrial Commission of Russia, 2013. DOI: 10.13140/RG.2.2.19127.73123

Companies based in Moscow
Defence companies of Russia
Military research facilities of Russia